Andrzej Bednarz (born 22 December 1980) is a Polish former professional football player for B71 Sandoy. who plays as a defender.

Club career
After a career exclusively in the first and second Polish divisions, Bednarz signed with Saba Qom F.C., becoming the first Pole to play in the Iran Pro League.

References

1980 births
Living people
Polish footballers
Zob Ahan Esfahan F.C. players
MKS Cracovia (football) players
Piast Gliwice players
Arka Gdynia players
Radomiak Radom players
Górnik Zabrze players
Saba players
RKS Radomsko players
Hutnik Nowa Huta players
Górnik Wieliczka players
Footballers from Kraków
Expatriate footballers in Iran
Expatriate footballers in the Faroe Islands
Polish expatriate sportspeople in Iran
Polish expatriate sportspeople in the Faroe Islands
Association football defenders